The Chery Omoda 5 is a compact crossover SUV produced by Chery since 2022. Omoda is the name of the new Chery global product series following the Tiggo series.

According to Chery, the letter "O" from Omoda represents "brand new", while "Moda" means a fashion trend. In some Western markets, the "O" was described as derived from the word "oxygen", while "Moda" means "modern". The Omoda line will be joined by three future models, namely Omoda 3, Omoda 7 and Omoda 9. In several markets, the model is marketed as the Omoda C5, under the separate Omoda brand.

Overview
The Omoda 5 was unveiled during the Auto Guangzhou 2021. During its development, the vehicle was known under the codename X-C. It is the first crossover SUV model of the Chery 4.0 products that features Chery's newly developed “Art in Motion” design language, and went on sale in China in the second quarter of 2022.

The interior of the Omoda 5 is equipped with two integrated 10.25-inch high-definition digital screens that offer control of driving, climate and entertainment settings.

Powertrain 
The 290T model is mated to a 7-speed dual-clutch transmission. For some markets such as Russia, the model is available with optional all-wheel drive.

Overseas markets 
The Omoda 5 was launched in the Chinese market in 2022 and production started in February 2022, with scheduled launch on various overseas markets. Vehicles destined for export markets are equipped with a different interior design, from the dashboard, central console, and door trims, which was styled by Chery’s Lead Designer Richard Koo.

The Omoda 5 is sold in Iran as the Fownix FX, and in Israel as the Chery FX. The model was released in October 2022 in Russia and Kazakhstan, and in March 2023 in South Africa. In these markets, Chery created a separate Omoda brand for its crossover to market it as the Omoda C5.

In Indonesia, the Omoda 5 was revealed for the market at the 30th Indonesia International Motor Show on 16 February 2023, and went on sale at the 2nd Gaikindo Jakarta Auto Week on 10 March 2023, as a locally assembled model. It is available in Z and RZ grade levels.

In March 2023, Chery released the Omoda 5 in Australia. Initial models are powered by a 1.5-litre petrol engine and front-wheel drive.

Safety 
In a Euro NCAP testing conducted in 2022, the Omoda 5 received a five-star rating.

References

External links

Official website (Australia)

Omoda 5
Cars of China
Compact sport utility vehicles
Crossover sport utility vehicles
Cars introduced in 2022
Euro NCAP small off-road